Marvin D. Price (April 5, 1932 - July 21, 2013) was a Negro league baseball player. He was one of the youngest players in Negro league history, suiting up for the Chicago American Giants at just 14 years old in 1946. He later played for the Cleveland Buckeyes and Newark Eagles from 1949 to 1952.

He later served in the Coast Guard and worked for the United States Postal Service.

He was born in, and died in, Chicago, Illinois. He was nicknamed "Thumper."

References

1932 births
2013 deaths
Chicago American Giants players
Newark Eagles players
Cleveland Buckeyes players
Baseball players from Chicago
20th-century African-American sportspeople
21st-century African-American people